The history of the French in Baltimore dates back to the 18th century. The earliest wave of French immigration began in the mid-18th century, bringing many Acadian refugees from Canada's Maritime Provinces. The Acadians were exiled from Canada by the British during the French and Indian War. Later waves of French settlement in Baltimore from the 1790s to the early 19th century brought Roman Catholic refugees of the French Revolution and refugees of the Haitian Revolution from the French colony of Saint-Domingue.

Demographics
In 1920, 626 foreign-born White people in Baltimore spoke the French language.

As of the 2000 United States Census the French American community in the Baltimore metropolitan area numbered 47,234 (1.9% of the area's population) and an additional 10,494 (0.4%) identified as French Canadian American. This places the Baltimore area's total population of French descent at 57,728, which is 2.3% of the area's population. The Census also found that the French language (including French Creole) is spoken at home by 5,705 people in Baltimore. In the same year Baltimore city's French population (excluding Basques) was 4,721, 0.7% of the city's population. There were also 824 French-Canadians, 0.1% of the population.

In 2013, an estimated 5,383 French-Americans resided in Baltimore city, 0.9% of the population. An additional 1,007 people, 0.2% of the population, were of French-Canadian descent.

As of September 2014, immigrants from France were the forty-fifth largest foreign-born population in Baltimore and the French language (including Patois and Cajun) was the fourth most commonly spoken language after English. French Creole was the thirtieth most spoken language other than English.

History

Arrival of Acadian refugees
The French and Indian War was the North American theater of the Seven Years' War, lasting from 1754 to 1763. There was intense fighting between the troops of British America and the French inhabitants of Acadia, a colony of New France located in what is now the Canadian Maritime provinces and the U.S. state of Maine. In 1755 the British forcibly exiled the French-speaking Acadians; approximately 11,500 were exiled in total. Most of the exiled Acadians who managed to survive traveled to Louisiana, where their descendants are known as Cajuns. Other refugees returned to France or resettled in Baltimore. Ships boarded with 913 Acadian refugees arrived in Maryland in November 1755. Shunned by a Francophobic population, the Acadians had to rely upon themselves to better their own conditions. Drawing on their experiences as fishers, many Acadian men became sailors and longshoremen.

Settlement by French Catholics

During the French Revolution (1789–1799), many French Catholics fled France to escape religious persecution. Among the refugees that immigrated to Baltimore were the Sulpician Fathers, a Roman Catholic teaching order. Most of the earliest Catholic institutions in Baltimore were established by these French refugees. The Sulpician Fathers founded St. Mary's Seminary and University and St. Mary's Seminary Chapel, as well as Catholic institutions elsewhere in Maryland such as Mount St. Mary's University in Emmitsburg, Maryland. Elizabeth Ann Seton, the first American-born Catholic saint, owned a home on the grounds of St. Mary's Seminary. She later moved to Emmitsburg and established the Sisters of Charity, the first American congregation for nuns. In the 1960s Seton's home was restored to its original appearance through the efforts of a committee, which continues to operate the home as a museum. The seminary was demolished during the mid-1970s,

Settlement by Franco-Haitian refugees
During the time of the French Revolution, there was a slave revolt on the French colony of Saint-Domingue, in what is now Haiti. Many French-speaking Black Catholic and white French Catholic refugees from San Domingo left for Baltimore. In total, 1,500 Franco-Haitians fled the island. The Haitian refugee population was multiracial and included white French-Haitians and their Afro-Haitian slaves, as well as many free people of color, some of whom were also slaveowners.

Along with the Sulpician Fathers, these refugees and their descendants founded St. Francis Xavier Church. The church is the oldest historically Black Catholic church in the United States.

During the Haitian Revolution, Baltimore passed an ordinance declaring that all slaves imported from the West Indies, including Haiti, were "dangerous to the peace and welfare of the city" and ordered slaveowners to banish them.

French Town

In the 1750s, the French Acadian refugees from Nova Scotia established a community along South Charles Street near Lombard Street that was known as "French Town". By the 1830s the Acadian presence in Baltimore had largely disappeared and with that French Town also disappeared.

The area that was formerly known as Frenchtown is now the Seton Hill Historic District.

Culture
An annual French Fair is held in Seton Hill. In 2014 it was on 11 October  from 12 to 5 in Saint Mary's Park.  The Seton Hill Association hosts this free French Fair to celebrate the neighborhood as Baltimore's old French Quarter. The Fair highlights city living and vendors of French themed food. It kicks off at 12 pm with DJ Steve Windows. Hot Club of Baltimore play jazz at 1 pm followed by a signature French Maid race at 2 pm. Black Cherry Puppet Theater performs a Marionette show at 2.30, Kevin McWha Steele sings from 3-4 pm and Victoria Vox finishes the music until 5 pm.  In between these acts there is hula hooping on the central green, Petanque in the park, a flea and craft market, Art on the Fence, and a kids' corner that will include building a 6-foot and mini Eiffel towers, Toddler Tour de France, a mini Grand Prix, face painting, sack races and other entertainment.

The Baltimore French School was founded in 1990 by a French immigrant who teaches the French language at Johns Hopkins University and the Peabody Conservatory.

Notable French-Americans from Baltimore

Bonaparte family in Baltimore

A line of the Bonaparte family has lived in Baltimore. Napoleon's brother Jérôme traveled to Baltimore to meet a man he had befriended in the French Navy. It was in Baltimore that he met his future wife, Elizabeth Patterson Bonaparte, also known as Betsy. They were married by the archbishop of Baltimore in the Baltimore Cathedral on Christmas Eve of 1803. The marriage was annulled by Napoleon and Jérôme returned to France with Betsy. She continued to live in Baltimore with their son, also named Jérôme. His son Charles Bonaparte was a lawyer and politician who served as Secretary of the Navy and later the Attorney General of the United States. Under his tenure as Attorney General, he was responsible for the creation of the Federal Bureau of Investigation.

Other notable people

Julie Bowen, an actress.
John J. Chanche, the first Roman Catholic Bishop of Natchez from 1841 to 1852.
Cipriano Ferrandini, an immigrant from Corsica and long-time barber/hairdresser at Barnum's Hotel in Baltimore.
Maximilian Godefroy, an architect and civil engineer.
Sidney Lanier, a musician, poet and author.
Michael Levadoux, a French Sulpician who went to the United States and founded St. Mary's Seminary in Baltimore.
Ambrose Maréchal, a prelate of the Roman Catholic Church who served as the third Archbishop of the Archdiocese of Baltimore.
Alphonse Magnien, the superior at St. Mary's Seminary and University in Baltimore from 1878 to 1902.
Jean Baptiste Ricord, a physician and naturalist.
Elizabeth Ann Seton, the first native-born citizen of the United States to be canonized by the Roman Catholic Church.
Frank Zappa, a musician, bandleader, songwriter, composer, recording engineer, record producer, and film director.

See also

Ethnic groups in Baltimore
History of Baltimore

Further reading

 Wood, Gregory A. "The French Presence in Maryland, 1524-1800", Gateway Press, 1978.
 Sullivan, Kathryn. Maryland and France, 1774-1789, 1936.

External links

Acadians in Baltimore
Acadians in Exile
Alliance Française de Baltimore
Baltimore French School
Maryland - 913 Acadians
Patterson-Bonaparte Collection - PP70
Percentage of French Canadians in Baltimore, MD by Zip Code
Percentage of French in Baltimore, MD by Zip Code
Seton Hill Neighborhood Association
The French in Maryland: A Talk Given to the Baltimore County Genealogical Society February 1996 by Robert Barnes

References

Acadian diaspora
 
Baltimore
French-Canadian American history
French-Canadian culture in the United States
Haitian-American culture in Maryland
French